In welfare economics, the compensation principle refers to a decision rule used to select between pairs of alternative feasible social states. One of these states is the hypothetical point of departure ("the original state").  According to the compensation principle, if the prospective gainers could compensate (any) prospective losers and leave no one worse off, the alternate state is to be selected (Chipman, 1987, p. 524).  An example of a compensation principle is the Pareto criterion in which a change in states entails that such compensation is not merely feasible but required.  Two variants are:
 the Pareto principle, which requires any change such that all gain.  
 the (strong) Pareto criterion, which requires any change such that at least one gains and no one loses from the change.  
In non-hypothetical contexts such that the compensation occurs (say in the marketplace), invoking the compensation principle is unnecessary to effect the change.  But its use is more controversial and complex with some losers (where full compensation is feasible but not made) and in selecting among more than two feasible social states.  In its specifics, it is also more controversial where the range of the decision rule itself is at issue.

Uses for the compensation principle include:
 comparisons between the welfare properties of perfect competition and imperfect competition 
 the Pareto principle in social choice theory
 cost–benefit analysis.

See also

 Compensating variation
 Cost–benefit analysis
 Kaldor–Hicks efficiency
 Pareto efficiency
 Social choice theory
 Welfare economics
 Theory of Second Best

References
 John S. Chipman ([1987] 2008). “compensation principle," The New Palgrave Dictionary of Economics, 2nd Edition.  Abstract.
 Kenneth J. Arrow (1963). Social Choice and Individual Values, ch. IV.  
 Louis Kaplow (2008).  "Pareto principle and competing principles," The New Palgrave Dictionary of Economics, 2nd Edition, Abstract.
 Dehez, P., & Tellone, D. (2013). Data games: Sharing public goods with exclusion. Journal of Public Economic Theory, 15(4), 654-673.

Welfare economics